Ricky M. Smallridge (born c. 1958) is an American professional golfer.

Smallridge played college golf at Auburn University, winning four events and earning All-American honors in 1979.

Smallridge worked as a club pro and also played mini-tours before joining the Ben Hogan Tour (now Nationwide Tour) in 1990. He played that tour from  1990 to 1996, winning twice: the 1990 Ben Hogan Boise Open and the 1991 Ben Hogan Elizabethtown Open. He also won the Alabama Open in 1989 and 1991.

Professional wins (4)

Ben Hogan Tour wins (2)

Other wins (2)
1989 Alabama Open
1991 Alabama Open

References

External links

American male golfers
PGA Tour golfers
Golfers from Alabama
1950s births
Living people